Cheng Ssu-yu (born 25 September 1989) is a Taiwanese footballer who plays as a goalkeeper for the Chinese Taipei women's national team.

References

1989 births
Living people
Women's association football goalkeepers
Taiwanese women's footballers
Footballers from Kaohsiung
Chinese Taipei women's international footballers
Okayama Yunogo Belle players
JEF United Chiba Ladies players